Statute law revision may refer to the printing of, or the editorial process of preparing, a revised edition of the statutes, or to the process of repealing obsolete enactments to facilitate the preparation of such an edition, or to facilitate the consolidation of enactments.

United Kingdom

History
Revision of the statutes was regarded by the Parliament of England as desirable as early as 1563 (see the preamble to the 5 Eliz 1 c 4). It was demanded by a petition of the Commons in 1610. Both Coke and Bacon were employed for some time on a commission for revision.

Halsbury's Laws said that the first Act for statute law revision (in the sense of repealing enactments which are obsolete, spent, unnecessary or superseded, or which no longer serve a useful purpose) was the 19 & 20 Vict c 64 (1856).

Preparation etc. of revised editions of the statutes
O. Hood Phillips defined statute law revision as "the reprinting of statute law with the omission of obsolete matter".

Legislation.gov.uk uses the terms "revise", "revised" and "revision" to refer to the editorial process of incorporating amendments and carrying through other effects into legislation.

Repeal of obsolete enactments
The Law Commission said that statute law revision originally referred to the repeal of enactments which had become inoperative, in order to facilitate the preparation of a revised edition of the statutes. They said that they intended to adopt a more forceful approach by also repealing enactments which no longer served a substantial purpose, and that they hoped that this would also facilitate consolidation.

Duty to prepare programmes of statute law revision
It is the duty of the Law Commission to prepare from time to time at the request of the Lord Chancellor comprehensive programmes of statute law revision, and to undertake the preparation of draft Bills pursuant to any such programme approved by the Lord Chancellor.

It is the duty of the Scottish Law Commission to prepare from time to time at the request of the Scottish Ministers comprehensive programmes of statute law revision, and to undertake the preparation of draft Bills pursuant to any such programme approved by the Scottish Ministers.

What legislation effects statute law revision
In 1971, the Law Commission said that not all statute law revision was being done by Statute Law Revision Bills or Statute Law (Repeals) Bills. They said that an example of this was the statute law revision effected by the Theft Act 1968.

Ireland
In the law of the Republic of Ireland, the Law Reform Commission (LRC) is involved in several types of statute law revision: consolidation of dispersed statutes, repeal of dead statutes, and "restatement" (publication of revised, current versions) of amended statutes. As regards consolidation and repeal, the LRC only makes recommendations, which are implemented by act of the Oireachtas (parliament). The LRC's remit under the Law Reform Commission Act 1975 is to make proposals for law reform, defined as "its development, its codification (including in particular its simplification and modernisation) and the revision and consolidation of statute law". The Statute Law (Restatement) Act 2002, modelled on the schemes in New South Wales and Queensland, empowers the Attorney General to authorise official restatements, which do not have force of law but are prima facie evidence of the state of the law. After four pilot restatements, responsibility for restatements was transferred from the Attorney General's office to the LRC in 2006. The Attorney General's electronic Irish Statute Book (eISB) includes the text of all statutes as enacted, each of which links to the LRC's corresponding revised version where available;  the LRC has restated 408 acts and two statutory instruments. Repeal of dead statutes falls under the Statute Law Revision Programme, begun in 2003 in the Attorney General's office, transferred in 2012 to the Department of Public Expenditure and Reform, and retransferred in 2020 to the LRC.

See also
Law Reform Act
Statute Law Revision Act
Statute Law (Repeals) Act

References

Citations

Further reading
Jowitt. Statute Law Revision and Consolidation. 1951.
Strickland, P. ''English Statute Law Revised. Analysis of the effect of the Legislation of 1895 and 1896. 2 vols. 1896 - 1897.
Marshall, "Statute Law Revision in the Commonwealth" (1964) 13 International and Comparative Law Quarterly 1407
Carrington, "Statute Law Revision" (1890) 4 Timehri 226
Francis Savage Reilly. Statute Law Revision: Observations on the New Edition of the Statutes in Preparation under the Authority of Her Majesty's Government. James Ridgway. Picadilly, London.1862. "Method of Legislation". Papers and Discussions on Jurisprudence: Being the Transactions of the National Association for the Promotion of Social Science. London Meeting, 1862. Butterworths. Fleet Street, London. 1862. pp 23 to 29.

External links

Statutory law